Bighill is an unincorporated community located in Madison County, Kentucky, United States. It lies east of Berea at the junction of Kentucky Route 21 and U.S. Route 421. The community is part of the Richmond–Berea Micropolitan Statistical Area.

History
Bighill, Kentucky was involved in the Civil War.

References

Unincorporated communities in Madison County, Kentucky
Unincorporated communities in Kentucky